Mario Arsenio Saldívar Rojas (born September 12, 1990) is a Paraguayan footballer, who plays for River Plate as a right back.

References

1990 births
Living people
Paraguayan footballers
Independiente F.B.C. footballers
Sportivo Luqueño players
Club Libertad footballers
Tombense Futebol Clube players
Deportivo Santaní players
Figueirense FC players
Campeonato Brasileiro Série A players
Paraguayan Primera División players
Expatriate footballers in Brazil
Paraguayan expatriate sportspeople in Brazil
Association football defenders